Bryan Hill may refer to:

 Bryan Hill School, St. Louis
 Bryan Hill (soccer) (active 2009), American soccer player, see 2009 PDL season and All-time Harrisburg City Islanders roster
 Bryan Edward Hill, writer

See also 
 Brian Hill (disambiguation)
 Hill (surname)